Ghulam Hassan Shaggan (1928, in Amritsar – 3 February 2015) was a Pakistani classical music singer of the Gwalior Gharana from the Hindustani classical music genre. Ustad Ghulam Hassan Shaggan was the recipient of numerous awards including the Pride of Performance (1988) and Sitara-e-Imtiaz (2000) (Star of Excellence) from the Government of Pakistan.

Personal life and early years
His father's name was Bhai Lal Mohammad (died 1962), who belonged to the Gwalior-Kapurthala Gharana. Ghulam Hassan Shaggan, along with his father and family, moved to Pakistan in 1947 and settled in Lahore.

Ghulam Hassan Shaggan lived in Iqbal Town, Lahore with his sons Qadir Shaggan (vocalist and music director) and Mazhar Shaggan (rabab and mandolin player).

Career
Ghulam Hassan Shaggan's father Bhai Lal Mohammad was appointed music supervisor at Radio Pakistan. His son, Ghulam Hassan Shaggan, had opportunities to perform at the radio station. Over a period of 12 years, as Shaggan gained recognition, he started performing more frequently at Radio Pakistan, The All Pakistan Music Conference, and other events in Pakistan and abroad.

International tours
In the 1990s, Ghulam Hassan Shaggan had received recognition in Europe as an outstanding representative of the North Indian classical music tradition. His talent was first recognized by French musicologists Gerard Kurgijian and Martina Catella. They invited him to perform in France, Sweden, Spain, Switzerland, Germany and the UK. 

Ghulam Hassan Shaggan also collaborated with the alternative/trance band Fun-Da-Mental. This band used an arrangement of his original bandish in Raag Bhopali in the band's 2001 album, There Shall be Love!

Final years
Even in his final years before his death in 2015, he continued to perform in public with youthful enthusiasm with the characteristic vigor of the Gwalior gayaki.

Awards and recognition 
Sangeet Samrat Award at the music conference in Calcutta in 1962
 Pride of Performance Award by the President of Pakistan in 1988
 Sitara-e-Imtiaz (Star of Excellence) in 2000 from the Government of Pakistan

He received countless awards and titles during his 1962 tour of India. He was conferred with the titles of Sangeet Rattan, Sangeet Alankar, Sangeet Samrat, Sindh Sangeet Mandalam and King of Music from the Sindh Sangeet Mandal in Mumbai. During the same 1962 tour of India, he was presented with a certificate of recognition by sarod maestro Hafiz Ali Khan of India.

In 2014, Ustad Ghulam Hassan Shaggan was honoured with the first Lifetime Achievement Award of the Lahore music forum.

Death and legacy
Ghulam Hassan Shaggan died on Tuesday, 3 February 2015 in Lahore, Pakistan at age 86. His son, Qadir Shaggan, reportedly said that his father had been suffering from heart disease. When his condition suddenly deteriorated, he was taken to Punjab Institute of Cardiology, where he was pronounced dead. Among his survivors are two sons, Qadir Shaggan who is also a classical music vocalist and a music director. The other son, Mazhar Shaggan, is a rabab and mandolin player.

References

1928 births
2015 deaths
Hindustani singers
Pakistani classical singers
Musicians from Amritsar
Recipients of the Pride of Performance
Recipients of Sitara-i-Imtiaz
Gwalior gharana
20th-century Indian singers
Classical music in Pakistan
Singers from Punjab, India
Pakistani music educators
20th-century Khyal singers